Jennifer L. Homendy is an American government official who is the chair of the National Transportation Safety Board in the Biden administration. Homendy has been the 44th member of the NTSB as of 2018. She has been chairwoman since August 13, 2021.

Early life and education 
Homendy is a native of Plainville, Connecticut. She earned a Bachelor of Arts degree from Pennsylvania State University and is a master's candidate at Clemson University.

Career 
In 1996 and 1997, Homendy worked as a government relations manager at the American Iron and Steel Institute. From 1997 to 1999, she was a legislative representative for the AFL–CIO Transportation Trades Department. From 1999 to 2004, she was a legislative representative for the International Brotherhood of Teamsters. From 2004 to 2018, she was a Democratic staff member for the United States House Transportation Subcommittee on Railroads, Pipelines, and Hazardous Materials. In 2018, she was appointed as a member of the National Transportation Safety Board.

National Transportation Safety Board
Homendy has been a member of the board since 2018.

Trump administration
On April 11, 2018, President Donald Trump nominated Homendy to be a member of the NTSB and finish out a term expiring in 2019. The Senate Commerce Committee held hearings on Homendy's nomination on May 16, 2018. The committee favorably reported her nomination to the Senate floor on May 22, 2018. Homendy was confirmed by the entire Senate on July 24, 2018, via voice vote.

Homendy was renominated to the board to serve a full five-year term by President Trump on December 14, 2018. The Commerce Committee held hearings on her nomination on July 24, 2019. The entire Senate confirmed her to a full term by voice vote on August 9, 2019.

Biden administration
On May 19, 2021, President Joe Biden nominated Homendy to serve as the chair of the NTSB. On June 24, 2021, the Senate Commerce Committee held hearings on the nomination. The committee favorably reported Homendy's nomination on August 4, 2021. The entire Senate confirmed her on August 9, 2021.

Tesla criticism 

Homendy has been critical of Tesla, Inc.'s so-called Full Self-Driving feature. She called the term full self-driving "misleading and irresponsible", and urged Tesla to address safety issues identified by the NTSB before expanding Full Self-Driving features that operate on city streets. In August 2021, Homendy praised the National Highway Traffic Safety Administration's probe of Tesla collisions with emergency services vehicles.

In response to a question regarding Homendy's comments, the CEO of Tesla Elon Musk tweeted a link to Homendy's Wikipedia page which resulted in a "number of attacks" on the content.

Personal life
Homendy, her husband Michael, and their daughter Alexandra currently live in Fredericksburg, Virginia.

References 

Living people
People from Plainville, Connecticut
Pennsylvania State University alumni
Chairman of the National Transportation Safety Board
Biden administration personnel
Trump administration personnel
International Brotherhood of Teamsters people
Year of birth missing (living people)
American women civil servants